Nekoma is the name of three communities in the United States:

 Nekoma, Illinois
 Nekoma, Kansas
 Nekoma, North Dakota